Men Without Names is a 1935 American crime film directed by Ralph Murphy and written by Kubec Glasmon and Howard J. Green. The film stars Fred MacMurray, Madge Evans, David Holt, Lynne Overman, Elizabeth Patterson, J. C. Nugent, Grant Mitchell and John Wray. The film was released on June 29, 1935, by Paramount Pictures.

Plot

Cast 

Fred MacMurray as Richard Hood / Richard 'Dick' Grant
Madge Evans as Helen Sherwood
David Holt as David Sherwood
Lynne Overman as Gabby Lambert
Elizabeth Patterson as Aunt Ella
J. C. Nugent as Major Newcomb
Grant Mitchell as Andrew Webster
John Wray as Sam 'Red' Hammond
Leslie Fenton as Monk
Clyde Dilson as Butch
Herbert Rawlinson as Crawford
Arthur Aylesworth as Drew
Dean Jagger as Jones
Harry Tyler as Steve
Helen Shipman as Becky
George Lloyd as Louis
Hilda Vaughn as Nurse Simpson
Russ Clark as Adams
Frank Shannon as Leahy
Paul Fix as The Kid
Helen Brown as Dorothy Lambert
Creighton Hale as Groom
Ivan Miller as FBI Agent
Buddy Roosevelt as FBI Agent
Stanley Andrews as Jim
Sam Godfrey as Reporter

References

External links 
 

1935 films
American crime films
1935 crime films
Paramount Pictures films
Films directed by Ralph Murphy
American black-and-white films
Films with screenplays by Kubec Glasmon
1930s English-language films
1930s American films